Frederick Wilfred Stocks (6 November 1918 – 23 February 1996) was an English cricketer who played first-class cricket for Nottinghamshire between 1946 and 1957. He was a left-handed middle-order batsman and a right-arm medium-pace bowler. He was born at Carcroft in Yorkshire and died at Sutton-on-Sea, Lincolnshire.

His father, also named Frederick Stocks, played two first-class cricket matches for Northamptonshire in 1906.

References

1918 births
1996 deaths
English cricketers
Nottinghamshire cricketers